Paretaxalus is a genus of longhorn beetles of the subfamily Lamiinae, containing the following species:

 Paretaxalus mucronatus (Schwarzer, 1931)
 Paretaxalus sandacanus Breuning, 1938

References

Pteropliini